Photography and the Archive Research Centre (PARC) is an organisation in London that commissions new research into photography and culture, curates and produces exhibitions and publications, organises seminars, study days, symposia and conferences, and supervises PhD students. It is a part of University of the Arts London (UAL), is based at UAL's London College of Communication at Elephant & Castle and was designated by UAL in 2003.

According to PARC's website its activities span the history and culture of photography, particularly post-war British photography, the documentation of war and conflict, the photography of fashion and style, the visualization of the counterculture and photographers as filmmakers.

Details
Val Williams is its director and Brigitte Lardinois its deputy director. The Centre has a core group of members including Tom Hunter, Alistair O'Neill, Patrick Sutherland, Wiebke Leister, Jennifer Good (née Pollard), David Moore, Paul Lowe, Corinne Silva, Paul Tebbs, Mark Ingham, Martina Caruso, Peter Cattrell, Monica Biaglioli, Anne Williams, Jananne Al-Ani, Sophy Rickett, Joanna Love and Sara Davidmann. Current staff are Corinne Silva (Research Fellow), Robin Christian (Projects Manager) and Melanie King (Research Administrator).

Many of PARC's activities are conducted in conjunction with other arts organisations and universities including University of Sunderland, National Media Museum in Bradford, Library of Birmingham, Canterbury Christ Church University, Street Level Photoworks in Glasgow, Wolverhampton Art Gallery, Ffotogallery in Cardiff, Imperial War Museum in London, Photoworks in Brighton, University of Western Ontario in Canada, Expressions of Humankind and Max Ström publishers in Stockholm, Sune Jonsson Archive in Umea, Tate Modern and University of Wales, Newport.

Two of PARC's divisions are War and Conflict Research Hub and Photography and the Contemporary Imaginary Research Hub.

PARC publishes Fieldstudy twice yearly, both in print and online, covering projects from PARC's staff, members and students.

PARC and Bloomsbury co-host the journal Photography & Culture, co-edited by Kathy Kubicki, Thy Phu and Val Williams, published three times a year by Berg.

PARC leads the Directory of Photographic Collections in the UK, a portal to UK institutions holding publicly accessible photographic collections.

Collections held within the Photography and the Archive Research Centre

PARC currently houses three collections within its archive, ‘Camerawork’, ‘Photography Exhibition Posters’ and ‘The John Wall archive of the Directory of British Photographic Collections in the UK’. 'Photography Exhibition Posters' is a collection of over 300 posters dating back to the 1970s that features examples of partnerships between designers and galleries. The ‘Camerawork’ collection includes papers and objects from the Half Moon Photography Workshop and Camerawork’s early years, publication and touring exhibition programme. ‘The John Wall archive of the Directory of British Photographic Collections in the UK’ includes correspondence, research papers and file cards of this 1970s project.

Selected exhibitions organised by PARC
2002-2005: Retrospective, Martin Parr Photoworks 1971–2000, Barbican Arts Centre, London, 2002. National Museum of Photography, Film, and Television, Bradford, 2002. Kunsthal, Rotterdam, The Netherlands, 2003. Museo Nacional Centro de Arte Reina Sofía, Madrid, 2003. National Museum of Photography, Copenhagen, 2003. Deichtorhallen, Hamburg, 2004. Works 1971–2001, Maison Européenne de la Photographie, Paris, 2005. Curated by Val Williams and organized by Brigitte Lardinois. Photographs from the 1970s to 2001 from his series Butlins by the Sea, June Street, Home Sweet Home, The Last Resort, The Cost of Living, Small World and Autoportraits.
2006: Magnum Ireland. Research into the Magnum Photos archive by Val Williams with Brigitte Lardinois resulting in an exhibition at the Irish Museum of Modern Art, Dublin.
2013: A Day In The World" curated by Val Williams, Brigitte Lardinois and Marcus Eriksson for the EOH Foundation at Kulturhuset Stockholm.
2014: Life on the Road with photography from Tom Hunter and Dave Fawcett, films by Andrew Gaston and curated by Val Williams at London College of Communication, London."This Guy Spent the Mid-90s Living in a Travelling Rave Van", Vice (magazine). Accessed 6 July 2014.
2014: Daniel Meadows: Early Photographic Works. A Retrospective exhibition curated by Val Williams at the Library of Birmingham and touring to National Media Museum, Bradford; Ffotogallery, Cardiff.

Exhibitions at PARCSpace
2014: Camerawork: Posters and Objects from the Archive.2014: Ken To Be Destroyed by Sara Davidmann."The artist who brought her uncle back to life as a woman", The Guardian. Accessed 05 August 2014.
2014: Paper Topographies by Patrick Sutherland.
2014: Single Saudi Women. Photographs by Wasma Mansour.

Publications originating at PARCDerek Ridgers: When We Were Young: Club and Street Portraits 1978–1987. Brighton: Photoworks, 2005. . Photographs by Derek Ridgers, text by Val Williams. About the emergence of new style cultures in London in the late 1970s and early 1980s.
  Anna Fox Photographs 1983–2007. Brighton: Photoworks, 2005. . Edited by Val Williams. With texts by David Chandler, Val Williams, Jason Evans and Mieke Bal.Magnum Ireland. London: Thames & Hudson, 2005. . Edited by Val Williams with Brigitte Lardinois.Glyndebourne, a Visual History. London: Quercus, 2009. . Edited by Val Williams and Brigitte Lardinois. Includes an essay by George Christie.The New Gypsies. Frankfurt, Germany: Prestel. By Ian McKell. Essay by Val Williams.
Hardback, 2010. .
Paperback, 2014.Daniel Meadows: Edited Photographs from the 70s and 80s. Brighton: Photoworks, 2011. . Authored by Val Williams. Edited by Val Williams and Gordon MacDonald.I belong Jarrow. Amsterdam: Schilt, 2012. . Photographs by Chris Harrison. Essay by Val Williams.Marjolaine Ryley: Growing up in the New Age. Hillsborough, NC: Daylight Press, 2013. . Essays by Malcolm Dickson (StreetLevel Photoworks), Brigitte Ryley, Peter Ryley, Val Williams. Additional photographs by Dave Walking. Martin Parr, Phaidon, 2014. . Authored by Val Williams.Sune Jonsson: Life and Work. MaxStrom, Stockholm. Text by Val Williams

FieldstudyFieldstudy 1 London: Stories.Fieldstudy 2.Fieldstudy 3: Charged Atmospheres. London: PARC. By Alison Merchant.Fieldstudy 4: Unfolding the Tissue: The Fashion and the Archive Study Day. London: PARC.Fieldstudy 5: Archives from the New British Photography London: PARC.Fieldstudy 6: Private Museum. London: PARC. Researched by Val Williams and Lorna Crabbe, photographed by Laura Thomas.Fieldstudy 7: Marjolaine Ryley: Résidence Astral: 1993-2005. London: PARC. Photographs taken over a twelve-year period in her grandmother's apartment in Brussels.Fieldstudy 8: MAP Reading. London: PARC. Catalogue of work from LCC's MA in Photography, 2006Fieldstudy 10: Visible London: PARC. Fieldstudy 11: Lovers, Liars & Laughter. London: PARC by Wiebke Leister.Fieldstudy 12: Fashion & Food London: PARC.Fieldstudy 14: Daniel Meadows, Butlin's by the Sea, 1972. London: PARC.Fieldstudy 15: Growing Up in the New Age. London: PARC, 2011. By Val Williams, Marjolaine Ryley (University of Sunderland) and Dave Walking. Features photographs by Dave Walking and essays by Val Williams, Marjolaine Ryley, Zoe Lippett and Malcolm Dickson.Fieldstudy 16: From a Distance. London: PARC. Photographs by Paul Reas.Fieldstudy 19: Ken. To be Destroyed.'' London: PARC, 2013.

Notes

References

External links
 
Directory of Photographic Collections in the UK, which is led by PARC
PARC's page at University of the Arts London

Photography museums and galleries in England
British photography organisations
Art museums and galleries in London
Arts organisations based in the United Kingdom
2004 establishments in England
Arts organizations established in 2004
Culture in London
Photo archives in the United Kingdom